Ma'avak (Struggle) was a Maoist-influenced political organisation in Israel in the early 1970s.

Officially known as the Revolutionary Communist Alliance (Hebrew: , HaBrit HaKomunistit HaMahapakhnit), the group became better known by the name of its journal, Ma'avak. It split from Matzpen in the autumn of 1970. Citing organisational, strategic and programmatic disagreements, Ma'avak stressed the colonial nature of the Israeli state. In its founding statement, Ma'avak stated "Our principles are based on Marxism-Leninism and proletarian internationalism". They stressed the October revolution as "the starting  point of the worldwide socialist revolution", and the Chinese revolution as its direct continuation, and identified with "the people of Vietnam, Korea and Palestine, and all those people whose heroic struggle against imperialism will not only lead them to a revolutionary path and participation in the international class war, but is also a direct source of experience and lessons for revolutionaries everywhere".

Members of the group included Udi Adiv, Ilan Halevi and Rami Livneh.

References

Political organizations based in Israel
Communist parties in Israel
Maoist organizations